Mike Cavan (born April 15, 1948) is a former American football player and coach.  He served as the head coach at Valdosta State University (1986–1991), East Tennessee State University (1992–1996) and Southern Methodist University (1997–2001), compiling a career college football record of 89–83–2.  Cavan played as a quarterback at the University of Georgia from 1968 to 1970 and was an assistant coach there from 1977 to 1985. He joined the Georgia staff under Kirby Smart as Special Assistant to the Head Coach. He was part of the staff that has won two national championships under Smart.

Head coaching record

References

1948 births
Living people
American football quarterbacks
East Tennessee State Buccaneers football coaches
Georgia Bulldogs football coaches
Georgia Bulldogs football players
SMU Mustangs football coaches
Valdosta State Blazers football coaches